Sophie Antoinette of Brunswick-Wolfenbüttel (13/23 January 1724 – 17 May 1802) was the tenth of 17 children of Ferdinand Albert II, Duke of Brunswick-Lüneburg.

Marriage
She married Ernest Frederick, Duke of Saxe-Coburg-Saalfeld on 23 April 1749 at Wolfenbüttel. Among her notable great-grandchildren were Prince Albert, Queen Victoria, Ferdinand II of Portugal, Empress Carlota of Mexico and Leopold II of Belgium.

Her children were the following:

 Franz Frederick Anton, Duke of Saxe-Coburg-Saalfeld (b. Coburg 15 July 1750- d. Coburg, 9 December 1806), father of Leopold I of Belgium and grandfather of Leopold II, Empress Carlota of Mexico, Queen Victoria of Great Britain, and her husband Prince Albert.
 Karl Wilhelm Ferdinand (b. Coburg, 21 November 1751- d. Coburg, 16 February 1757).
 Fredericka Juliane (b. Coburg, 14 September 1752 - d. Coburg, 24 September 1752).
 Caroline Ulrike Amalie (b. Coburg, 19 October 1753 - d. Coburg, 1 October 1829), a nun at Gandersheim.
 Ludwig Karl Frederick (b. Coburg, 2 January 1755 - d. Coburg, 4 May 1806); he had an illegitimate son by a Mademoiselle Brutel de la Riviére: Ludwig Frederick Emil of Coburg (b. Hildburghausen, 1779 - d. Coburg, 1827). In turn, the five children of Ludwig Frederick were created Freiherren von Coburg. His descendants still live.
 Ferdinand August Heinrich (b. Coburg, 12 April 1756 - d. Coburg, 8 July 1758).
 Frederick (b. Coburg, 4 March 1758 - d. Coburg, 26 June 1758).

Ancestry

References

|-

1724 births
1802 deaths
Duchesses of Saxe-Coburg-Saalfeld
People from Wolfenbüttel
House of Brunswick-Bevern
Duchesses of Brunswick-Lüneburg
Daughters of monarchs